A belted cow (nicknamed beltie or Oreo cow) may refer to:

 Belted Galloway from Scotland
 Dutch Belted (Lakenvelder)